Quezon, officially the Municipality of Quezon,  is a 1st class municipality in the province of Palawan, Philippines. According to the 2020 census, it has a population of 65,283 people.

It is home to the Tabon Caves where the remains of the Tabon Man were discovered.

History
The Municipality of Quezon was created in 1951 from the barrios of Berong and Alfonso XIII from Aborlan and the barrios of Iraan, Candawaga and Canipaan from Brooke's Point.

In 1957, the sitios of Aramaywan, Isugod, Tabon, Sawangan, Calumpang, Campong-Ulay, Ransang, Cadawaga, Culasian, Panalingaan, Taburi, Latud and Canipaan were converted into barrios.

Geography

Barangays
Quezon is politically subdivided into 14 barangays.
 Alfonso XIII (Poblacion)
 Aramaywan
 Berong
 Calumpang
 Isugod
 Quinlogan
 Maasin
 Panitian
 Pinaglabanan
 Sowangan
 Tabon
 Kalatagbak
 Malatgao
 Tagusao

Climate

Demographics

Economy

References

External links
Quezon Profile at PhilAtlas.com
[ Philippine Standard Geographic Code]
Philippine Census Information
Local Governance Performance Management System

Municipalities of Palawan